Kodaira (written: 小平) is a Japanese surname. Notable people with the surname include:

, Japanese mathematician and Fields medalist
, Japanese speed skater and Olympic gold medalist
, Japanese politician
, Japanese World War II flying ace
, Japanese serial killer
, Japanese voice actress

Japanese-language surnames